Daria Bucur (born 11 July 1999) is a Romanian female handball player who plays for Corona Brașov and the Romanian national team.

International honours 
Youth European Championship:
Fourth place: 2015

References

  

1999 births
Living people
Sportspeople from Constanța
Romanian female handball players